Joni Sternbach (born 1953) is an American photographer whose large-format camera images employ early photographic processes, including tintype and collodion. Using an 8×10 Deardorff large format camera, Sternbach focuses on in situ portraits of surfers. Sternbach's photographs are particularly notable for highlighting women surfers and surf culture, and for her ethnographic rather than action approach.

Early life 
Sternbach was born in the Bronx, New York in 1953. She received her M.A. in photography from the International Center for Photography at NYU in 1987. She has also taught photography at New York University and the International Center of Photography and Cooper Union.

Work
In a National Geographic profile, Sternbach describes her relation to using early photographic processes as deploying a medium in need of an appropriate subject matter, one that she gradually found surfers to fulfill quite by accident: "Once I understood the limitations of the process, I realized that it was more of a question of finding a subject matter to suit the medium, not the other way around." Indeed, Sternbach is regarded as a master and pioneer of the 20th-21st-century revival of early analog processes.

Photographs in Sternbach's 2009 book Surfland are described by The New York Times as "a kind of ethnographic study in stillness, silvery portraits of a tribe united by a sense of adventure, the love of a sport and a connection to the ocean." Sternbach's "16.02.20 #1 Thea+Maxwell" from the series Surfland was awarded second place in the 2016 Taylor Wessing Photographic Portrait Prize. Sternbach has been recognized for her work as a female surf photographer.

Collections
National Portrait Gallery, London
Maison Européenne de la Photographie, Paris, France 
Museum of Fine Arts, Texas
Nelson-Atkins Museum of Art, Kansas City, Missouri 
Peabody Essex Museum, Salem, Massachusetts.
LA County Museum of Art, Los Angeles, California

Books 
Surfland (2009), Photolucida
Surf Site Tin Type (2014), Damiani Editore
Surfboard (2020), self published
Kissing a Stranger (2021), Dürer Editions

References 

20th-century photographers
21st-century photographers
American contemporary artists
New York University alumni
Surf culture
Living people
20th-century American women photographers
20th-century American photographers
1953 births
21st-century American women photographers
21st-century American photographers
21st-century American women